The Grand Lodge of the Republic of Liberia is a fraternal organization based on the principles of Prince Hall Freemasonry. Prior to 1980, its membership tended to consist of Americo-Liberians and it was influential within the ruling True Whig party from its founding until the coup of Samuel Doe in 1980, when much of its senior leadership was killed and the new military regime banned masonic activities in the country.

History

Origins 

Among the settlers that arrived in 1822 to the future Republic of Liberia, were a few freemasons hailing from Negro lodges in the United States of America that were founded by Prince Hall.

After the lapse of a period extending over forty years, the surviving Masons, who included a number of past Presidents and Vice Presidents of Liberia, felt that the time had arrived for the formal organization of Craft Masonry in Liberia. In 1867, Thomas Amos, Joseph Jenkins Roberts, Beverly P. Yates, Charles B. Dunbar, Sr., F. Johns, John N. Lewis, John H. Chivers, James C. Minor, John Seys, James M. Priest, Samuel C. Glassgow, William S. Anderson and Gabriel Moore, assembled a convention in Monrovia, at which it was decided that Thomas Amos would spearhead the establishment of a Grand Lodge in Liberia. Subsequently, the necessary dispensation was acquired to launch Oriental Lodge No. 1 in Monrovia "to Enter, Pass and Raise Free-masons according to the ancient customs and usages of the Craft." Similar dispensations were also granted for the erection of two other lodge, now known as Saint Paul Lodge No. 2 of the Clay-Ashland Settlement, and Saint John’s Lodge No. 3 also of Monrovia.

Having the requisite lodges to create a Grand Lodge, a second Convention was held in Monrovia to draw up a constitution with certain by-laws. Elections also occurred and the elected officers were installed as follows:

 Thomas H. Amos, as Grand Master
 Ashbury F. Johns, as Deputy grand Master
 Beverly P. Yates, as Senior Grand Warder
 H. W. Johnson, as Junior Grand Warden
 Gabriel Moore, as Grand Treasurer
 John N. Lewis, as Grand Secretary

The formation of the Grand Lodge of the Republic of Liberia was announced with the following words:

This appeal met the positive response of most of the Masonic Grand Bodies of the World, namely:

 Grand Lodge of England
 Grand Lodge of Scotland
 Grand Lodge of Australia
 Grand Lodge of New Zealand
 Grand Lodge of Belgium
 Grand Lodge of Chile
 Grand Lodge of Haiti
 Grand Lodge of Germany
 Grand Lodge of Hamburg
 Grand Lodge of Hungary
 Grand Lodge of Spain
 The Grand Orient of France
 Grand Lodge of Berlin
 Grand Lodge of Victoria
 Grand Lodge of Italy

Expansion and political dominance
The Grand Lodge of Liberia was founded in 1867. By the 1970s there were 17 subordinate lodges and the majority of Liberia's high-ranking officials were Masons. Matters of state were widely believed to have been decided from within the lodges. Being a Mason was a veritable prerequisite for positions of political leadership in the True Whig Party. Liberia's Masons were criticized for their influence as well as for the exclusion of indigenous Liberians from their ranks.

Prohibition and reinstatement 
After Master Sgt. Samuel Doe assumed leadership in a coup d'etat in 1980, Liberia's masons faced violent retribution. The President of Liberia and the order's Grand Master, William R. Tolbert, Jr., was overthrown and killed in the coup.  Freemasonry was banned by Doe in 1980, which caused the Grand Lodge's influence in Liberia to greatly diminish. President Doe, who later desired to become a Mason, lifted the ban on Masonic activities which led to the convening of a special Prince Hall meeting held in New Orleans in 1987 to elect a new Grand Master. This was followed by a meeting in Monrovia in 1988 when Freemasonry was formally reinstituted. President Doe was subsequently initiated in 1989.

In 1990, Samuel Doe in turn was murdered by Prince Johnson, one time ally of Charles Taylor, in an internationally televised display. To prove that Doe was not protected by black magic, his ears were cut off, then some of his fingers and toes, and finally he was murdered by decapitation and buried (his body was later exhumed and reburied). The spectacle of his torture was videotaped and seen on news reports around the world. The video shows Johnson sipping a beer and being fanned by an assistant as Doe's ear is cut off.

During and after the civil war 

During the First Liberian Civil War, the Grand Masonic Temple in Monrovia was the scene of many battles, and its ruins became home to thousands of squatters. On trial, President Charles Taylor made light of allowing his troops to post human heads and skulls of enemies at checkpoints, saying it was no worse than the display of skulls in “Western fraternal organizations.” 

The Masons evicted squatters from the Grand Lodge by 2005, and the Masonic Temple has resumed to hold meetings for the subordinate Lodges in the Blue Lodge Room, quarterly Grand Communications in the Grand Lodge room as well as meetings for the Order of Eastern Star and its subordinate Chapters in their respective rooms within the Temple. According to the Grand Lodge's 2015 reports, there are 19 Subordinate Lodges in Liberia with a total membership of 1,750. Benoni Urey, a Freemason who is considered Liberia’s richest man and a possible candidate for the Liberian presidency, has said he wants to see the Masonic Order of Liberia return to prominence in Liberian politics.

List of Grand Masters 
 Thomas H. Amos (1867–1869)
 Joseph Jenkins Roberts (1869–1872)
 Beverly L. Yates (1872–1874)
 Charles B. Dunbar Sr. (1874–1876)
 Reginald A. Sherman Sr. (1876–1879)
 William M. Davies (1879–1889)
 Charles T. O. King (1889–1901)
 Alfred Benedict King (1901)
 Hilary W. Travis (1901–1908)
 William David Coleman (1908)
 A. Benjamin Stubblefield (1908–1916)
 Charles B. Dunbar, Jr. (1916–1920)
 Charles D. B. King (1920–1929)
 Nathaniel H. B. Cassell (1929–1931)
 William Oliver Davies-Bright (1931–1933)
 Joseph Samuel Dennis (1933–1934)
 John C. A. Gibson Sr. (1934–1936)
 Joseph Fulton Dunbar Sr. (1936–1941)
 Anthony Barclay (1941–1943)
 Louis Arthur Grimes (1943–1946)
Clarence Lorenzo Simpson Sr.
 William V. S. Tubman Sr.
 Christian Abayomi Cassell
 Charles T. O. King II
 Richard AbromHenries Sr. 
 Frank E. Tolbert Sr.
 William R. Tolbert Jr.
 McKinley A. Deshield Sr.
 E. Jonathan Goodridge
 James E. Greene
 S. Alfred P. Harris Sr.
 E. Reginald Townsend
 Philip J. L. Brumskine
 George E. Henries
 James Elijah Pierre 33°

References

External links 
Grand Lodge of Masons, A.F & A.M Republic of Liberia 

Liberia
Liberia
History of Liberia
Prince Hall Freemasonry
Clubs and societies in Liberia
Masonic organizations
Former squats
Squatting in Liberia